Thomas Dürr (born 12 July 1978) is a Liechtensteiner bobsledder who has competed since 2006. At the 2010 Winter Olympics in Vancouver, he crashed out in the two-man event, on a run that also saw crashes for Great Britain, Australia and Canada. He withdrew from the four-man event.
 
Dürr's best overall finish was sixth at the 2009 North American Cup, Park City, Utah in the four man event.

References 

1978 births
Bobsledders at the 2010 Winter Olympics
Liechtenstein male bobsledders
Living people
Olympic bobsledders of Liechtenstein